The Open Mind is a nationally broadcast public affairs interview program. It is one of the longest running program in the history of American public television. First broadcast in May 1956, this "thoughtful excursion into the world of ideas" across politics, media, technology, the arts and realms of civic life currently originates from CUNY TV studios and airs on public television stations. Its creator, Richard Heffner, was host until his death on December 17, 2013. Alexander Heffner, Richard Heffner's grandson, took over as the program's host in 2014 renewing its commitment to civil discourse for the new generation.

History
The Open Mind was conceived to elicit meaningful insights into the challenges that society faces in contemporary areas of public concern. The program's title is attributed to a quote of Barnard College dean Virginia Gildersleeve, "Keep an open mind, but not so open that your brains fall out." The theme music chosen by Heffner, "World Without Time," is by the Sauter-Finegan Orchestra from their LP Adventures in Time. Recent guests have included Pete Buttigieg, John Kasich, Bernie Sanders, Ernesto Zedillo, Salman Rushdie, Omar Saif Ghobash, Jonathan Sacks, John I. Jenkins, 9th Wonder, Shabaka Hutchings, J.B. Smoove, Claes de Vreese, Joe Weisberg, Kathleen Hall Jamieson, Nan Whaley, Mitchell Baker, Zeynep Tufekci, Naomi Oreskes, and Maya Soetoro-Ng. In May 2016, the program entered its 60th season.

Guests
Thousands of guests have appeared on the program, including many prominent civil- and human-rights leaders (Martin Luther King Jr., Malcolm X, Gloria Steinem, Elie Wiesel, Ken Roth), intellectuals and historians  (William F. Buckley, John Hope Franklin, Neil Postman, Robert Caro), economists (Milton Friedman, Alan Greenspan, Paul Krugman), politicians (Daniel Patrick Moynihan, Richard Lugar, Dianne Feinstein), jurists and lawyers (Thurgood Marshall, Stephen Breyer, Judith Kaye,  Tim Wu, Jameel Jaffer), educators (Arne Duncan, John Palfrey, Martha Minow, Michael S. Roth), journalists (Frank Bruni, Jean Guerrero, Isobel Yeung, Wesley Lowery), and musicians (Macy Gray, Moby, Aloe Blacc, Ottmar Liebert).

See also
 List of longest running United States television series

References

External links
 
 
 The Open Mind archive at Internet Archive.

1956 American television series debuts
1950s American television series
1960s American television series
1970s American television series
1980s American television series
1990s American television series
2000s American television series
2010s American television series
2020s American television series
Black-and-white American television shows
Local talk shows in the United States
PBS original programming